Oswaldo Domingues (14 February 1917 – 4 January 2009) was a Brazilian sprinter. He competed in the men's 100 metres at the 1936 Summer Olympics.

References

1917 births
2009 deaths
Athletes (track and field) at the 1936 Summer Olympics
Brazilian male sprinters
Olympic athletes of Brazil
Place of birth missing